After the Storm (German: Nach dem Sturm) is a 1948 drama film directed by Gustav Ucicky and starring Maria Schell. It was made as a co-production between Austria, Switzerland and Liechtenstein, based on a novella by Carl Zuckmayer. 

Shooting took place at the Bellerive Studios in Zurich and on location in Ascona, Salzburg and Monte San Salvatore in Ticino. The film's sets were designed by the art directors Robert Furrer and Otto Niedermoser.

Plot
A talented young female musician tries to rebuild her life having been imprisoned during the Second World War.

Cast

References

External links

Austrian drama films
Swiss drama films
1948 drama films
Films based on works by Carl Zuckmayer
Films directed by Gustav Ucicky
Austrian black-and-white films
Swiss black-and-white films
Sascha-Film films
1940s German-language films